The Musar movement (also Mussar movement) is a Jewish ethical, educational and cultural movement that developed in 19th century Lithuania, particularly among Orthodox Lithuanian Jews. The Hebrew term , is adopted from the Book of Proverbs (1:2) describing moral conduct, instruction or discipline, educating oneself on how one should act in an appropriate manner. The term was used by the Musar movement to convey the teachings regarding ethical and spiritual paths. The Musar movement made significant contributions to Musar literature and Jewish ethics. The movement has been revived in the 21st century amongst Jews of all denominations, particularly in the United States.

Origin 
The Musar movement arose among non-Hasidic Orthodox Lithuanian Jews as a response to the social changes brought about by the Enlightenment, and the corresponding Haskalah movement among many European Jews. In this period of history anti-Semitism, the assimilation of many Jews into Christianity, and the impoverished living conditions of many Jews in the Pale of Settlement caused severe tension and disappointment. Many of the institutions of Lithuanian Jewry were beginning to break up. Religious Jews feared that their way of life was slipping away from them, observance of traditional Jewish law and custom was on the decline, and even those who remained loyal to the tradition were losing their emotional connection to its inner meaning and ethical core.

Early leaders 
The founding of this movement is attributed to Rabbi Yisrael Lipkin Salanter (1810–1883), although the roots of the movements drew on ideas previously expressed in classical rabbinical literature.

Rabbi Yisrael Salanter

Yisrael Lipkin Salanter, a promising young rabbi with exceptional knowledge of Jewish law living in Salantai, Lithuania, was initially inspired to dedicate his life to the cause of spreading Musar by his teacher Rabbi Yosef Zundel Salant (1786–1866). Zundel Salant was a student of rabbis Chaim Volozhin and Akiva Eiger, whose profoundly good-hearted and humble behavior and simple lifestyle attracted Yisrael Salanter's interest. Zundel Salant was said to urge Salanter to focus on Musar.

Widely recognized as a rabbi of exceptional talent, Yisrael Salanter became head of a yeshivah in Vilna, where he quickly became well known in the community for his scholarship. He soon resigned this post to open up his own yeshiva, in which he emphasized moral teachings based on the ethics taught in traditional Jewish rabbinic works, especially Musar literature. Salanter referred to his approach as the Musar approach, using the Hebrew word for ethical discipline or correction.

In seeking to encourage the study of Musar literature, Salanter had three works of Musar literature republished in Vilna: Mesillat Yesharim by Moshe Chaim Luzzatto, Tikkun Middot ha-Nefesh by Solomon ibn Gabirol, and Cheshbon Ha-Nefesh by Menachem Mendel Lefin.

He particularly concentrated on teaching Jewish business ethics, saying that just as one checks carefully to make sure his food is kosher, so too should one check to see if his money is earned in a kosher fashion.

Rabbi Salanter set an example for the Lithuanian Jewish community during the cholera epidemic of 1848, ensuring that necessary relief work on Shabbat for Jews was done by Jews (despite the ordinary prohibition against doing work on Shabbat), and ordering Jews whose lives were in danger to eat rather than fast on the fast day of Yom Kippur.

In 1848, the Czarist government created the Vilna Rabbinical School and Teachers' Seminary. Salanter was identified as a candidate to teach at the school, but he refused the position and left Vilna. Salanter moved to Kovno, where he established a Musar-focused yeshiva at the Nevyozer Kloiz.

In 1857 he moved to Germany. By this time his own students from Kovno had begun to set up their own yeshivot in Kelme, Telz, and elsewhere. Salanter later helped to found another institution, the Kovno Kollel.

In Germany, Salanter founded a periodical entitled Tevunah, dedicated in part to Musar. Many of Rabbi Salanter's articles from Tevunah were collected and published in Imrei Binah (1878). His Iggeret ha-Musar ("ethical letter") was first published in 1858 and then repeatedly thereafter. Many of his letters were published in Or Yisrael ("The Light of Israel") in 1890 (edited by Rabbi Yitzchak Blazer). Many of his discourses were published in Even Yisrael (1883).

Salanter also wrote "An Essay on the Topic of Reinforcing Those who Learn our Holy Torah," published by his students in a collection of essays titled Etz Pri. This essay is important for its exploration of the concept of the subconscious, well before the concept was popularized by Sigmund Freud. In Salanter's essay, the concept of conscious ("outerness" [chitzoniut]) and subconscious ("innerness" [penimiut]) processes and the role they play in the psychological, emotional and moral functioning of man is developed. Salanter explains that it is critical for a person to recognize what his subconscious motivations [negiot] are and to work on understanding them. He also teaches that the time for a person to work on mastering subconscious impulses was during times of emotional quiet, when a person is more in control of his thoughts and feelings. Salanter stresses that when a person is in the middle of an acute emotional response to an event, he is not necessarily in control of his thoughts and faculties and will not have access to the calming perspectives necessary to allow his conscious mind to intercede.

Scholar Hillel Goldberg and others have described Salanter as a "psychologist" as well as a moralist.

Second generation 
After Salanter's death, the Musar movement was led by his disciples, who developed the movement in various ways.

Salanter's eldest disciple, Rabbi Simcha Zissel Ziv, directed yeshivas in Kelme and Grobin. These yeshivas broke with established models of yeshivot in a number of ways, especially by devoting significant time to the study of musar and by teaching general, non-Jewish studies. Simcha Zissel also wrote discourses that deeply engaged questions of moral virtue and gave particular attention to the importance of love for others.

A second student of Salanter's, Rabbi Yitzchak Blazer became the chief rabbi of St. Petersburg in 1861-2, and later led the Kovno kollel. Blazer also published many of Salanter's writings. 

A third leading disciple of Salanter, Rabbi Naftali Amsterdam, became the chief rabbi of Helsinki.

Third generation 

In the following generation, leaders of the Musar movement included Zissel's student Nosson Tzvi Finkel of Slabodka, and Rabbi Yosef Yozel Horwitz of Novaradok. The schools founded by these two men became the largest and most influential schools of Musar. The Slobodka school founded by Finkel became especially influential, but the Novaradok school also gained a significant following. Louis Jacobs has described the difference between these two schools as follows:

Controversy 

In later years some opposition to the Musar movement developed in large segments of the Orthodox community. Many opposed the new educational system that Yisrael Salanter set up, and others charged that deviations from traditional methods would lead to assimilation no less surely than the path of classic German Reform Judaism.

In 1897, Eliezer Gordon of the Telshe yeshiva, hired a new Musar supervisor, Rabbi Leib Chasman, who instituted a very strict Musar regime in the yeshiva. Many of the students opposed this approach, which caused dissent among the student body. At the same time, dissent against Musar also broke out at the Slobodka Yeshiva. A group of Lithuanian rabbis then published a declaration in the Hebrew newspaper Ha-Melitz in opposition to the study of Musar. According to the YIVO Encyclopedia,

After World War II 

Many of the Jews involved in the Musar movement were killed in the Holocaust. Hillel Goldberg has written that it was only before World War II that Musar was "still a living community."

Some students of the Musar movement, however, settled in the land of Israel and established Musar yeshivas there.

While many former students of the Musar movement settled in the United States and were involved in a variety of Jewish institutions, they established few formal institutions dedicated to Musar during the 20th century.

Many traditional yeshivas throughout the world, however, continued to allot some time during the week for Musar, and this continues today. This time is often dedicated to the study of Musar literature.

21st century revival 
At the start of the 21st century, a significant revival of interest in the Musar movement has occurred in North America in various sectors of the Jewish world.

The Mussar Institute, founded by Alan Morinis and afterwards led by Avi Fertig, has achieved a very wide reach with over 7,000 members and 400 chaveirim, a dedicated group of members committed to frequent musar study. Within the Orthodox community, the AishDas Society, founded by Rabbi Micha Berger, and the Salant Foundation, founded by Rabbi Zvi Miller, are organizations which organize Musar groups, classes and other teaching events. Orthodox rabbis Yechiel Yitzchok Perr, Hillel Goldberg, Elyakim Krumbein, Avi Fertig, David Jaffe and Micha Berger have published English books about various aspects of Musar. The founders of both The Mussar Institute and the AishDas Society found much of their inspiration in Rabbi Hillel Goldberg's English work, The Fire Within: A Living Heritage of the Musar (1987). Dr. Alan Morinis, founder of The Mussar Institute, writes "it was the introduction to my spiritual lineage....it holds a special place (for me)." Micha Berger notes it was the book "which inspired me to explore musar," a topic which had already been central to his life as founder of the AishDas Society. 

Though the Musar movement was a historically Orthodox Jewish movement, its approach has gained significant traction among non-Orthodox Jews, who have spearheaded much of its 21st century revival. The Mussar Institute and the Center for Contemporary Mussar, founded by Rabbi Ira F. Stone, are among the institutions which have sought to spread the practice of Musar in a non-Orthodox framework. Morinis' book Everyday Holiness (2007) and Stone's book A Responsible Life (2007) were among the popular books that sparked contemporary interest in the Musar movement. Musar has been described as "an emerging and growing phenomenon" within Reform Judaism, and leaders of Conservative Judaism have debated whether Musar should stand at the center of its approach. Geoffrey Claussen of Elon University has argued that the Musar movement's conception of Jewish practice may be especially valuable for Conservative Judaism. Greg Marcus of the organization American Mussar has said that Musar can be accessible to many American Jews who don't speak any Hebrew, and can be adapted to the spiritual needs of American Jews.

Some Musar groups have no connection with synagogues, but a number of synagogues have started programs for the study of Musar. There are also online communities dedicated to the exploration of Musar and character trait development.

Musar practice has been incorporated into the curriculum at Jewish day schools such as the Gann Academy and at rabbinical schools such as the Academy for Jewish Religion (California) and the Reconstructionist Rabbinical College.

Some teachers have recommended the practice of Musar not only for Jews but also among non-Jews. The website of the Mussar Institute said:

Study and practice
The Musar Institute website says:

Musar practices include text study, meditation, silence and retreat, diary practices, chanting (nigunim), contemplation, visualization, tzedakah, and doing good deeds on behalf of others.

Musar literature

One of the central practices of the Musar movement was studying and meditating on classical musar literature. Classics of Musar literature include:

 Chovot HaLevavot, by Bahya ibn Paquda (11th century)
 Ma'alot HaMiddot, by Yehiel ben Yekutiel Anav of Rome
 Mesillat Yesharim, and Derech Hashem, by Moshe Chaim Luzzatto
 Orchot Tzaddikim (The Ways of the Righteous), by an anonymous author
 Tomer Devorah (The Palm Tree of Deborah) by Moses ben Jacob Cordovero
 Shaarei Teshuvah (The Gates of Repentance) by Yonah Gerondi
 Madreigat Ha'Adam by Yosef Yozel Horwitz
 Cheshbon HaNefesh (Accounting of the Soul) by Menachem Mendel Lefin of Satanov (based in part on Benjamin Franklin's idea of the thirteen virtues)
 "The Musar Letter" of the Vilna Gaon

Meditation 
The Musar Movement has encouraged a number of Jewish meditation practices using introspection and visualization that could help to improve moral character. Many meditation techniques were described in the writings of Rabbi Simcha Zissel Ziv. Alan Morinis, the founder of the Mussar Institute, recommends morning meditation practices that can be as short as four minutes. One of the meditations recommended by Morinis is the practice of focusing on a single word: the Hebrew word Sh'ma, meaning "listen."

Nigunim and Chant 
The Musar movement has also encouraged the chanting of nigunim, based on the realization of how music affects the inner life. In the 19th century, the Musar movement developed its own distinctive nigun chanting traditions. In the 21st century, nigunim may be used at the start and the end of musar study sessions and may help to create an emotional musar experience.

Charity 
Musar writings describe giving charity as a central obligation and a central way to cultivate the character trait of generosity.

Giving musar
"Giving musar" (discipline, instruction) refers to a way to use one's speech to correct, admonish, or reprove others (Leviticus 19:17), in line with a verse from Proverbs 1:8 also in the daily prayer book: "Hear, my child, the discipline (musar) of your father, and do not forsake the teachings of your mother." Giving musar through speech is meant to help mold lives. Shimon Schwab taught that although "[at times] you must give musar" the command to do so (Lev. 19:17) is followed by love your neighbor as yourself. and that "if you want ..(someone).. to change, (it must be) done through love."

Giving musar may also happen through a formal lecture known as a musar shmuz or musar shiur, which are often part of a yeshiva curriculum. Elya Lopian taught the practice as "teaching the heart what the mind already understands."

See also
 Ethics
 Jewish ethics
 Jewish meditation
 Musar literature

References

English-language bibliography 

 Studies of the 19th-century Musar Movement
 Rabbi Israel Salanter and the Musar Movement, Immanuel Etkes (Jewish Publication Society, 1993).
 The Musar Movement, Dov Katz (vol. 1 translated by into English by Leonard Oschry).
 Rabbi Israel Salanter: Religious-Ethical Thinker, Menahem G. Glenn (Dropsie College, 1953).
 Israel Salanter, Text, Structure, Idea: The Ethics and Theology of an Early Psychologist of the Unconscious, Hillel Goldberg (KTAV, 1982).
 Sharing the Burden: Rabbi Simhah Zissel Ziv and the Path of Musar, Geoffrey Claussen (SUNY Press, 2015).

 Contemporary works adapting the Musar movement's teachings
 The Book of Jewish Values, Joseph Telushkin (Bell Tower, 2000).
 The Fire Within: The Living Heritage of the Musar Movement, Hillel Goldberg (Mesorah, 1987).
 A Responsible Life: The Spiritual Path of Musar, Ira F. Stone (Aviv Press, 2006).
 Climbing Jacob's Ladder: One Man's Rediscovery of a Jewish Spiritual Tradition, Alan Morinis (Broadway Books, 2002).
 Everyday Holiness: The Jewish Spiritual Path of Musar, Alan Morinis (Trumpeter Books, 2007).
 Every Day, Holy Day: 365 Days of Teachings and Practices from the Jewish Tradition of Musar, Alan Morinis (Trumpeter Books, 2010).
 The Handbook to Jewish Spiritual Renewal: A Path of Mussar Transformation for the Modern Jew, Rabbi Arthur Segal (Amazon Books, 2009).
 The Mussar Torah Commentary: A Spiritual Path to Living a Meaningful and Ethical Life, Barry Block ed. (CCAR Press, 2020).

External links 
 About the 19th-century Musar movement
Louis Jacobs on the Musar movement
The Orthodox Union on Rabbi Yisrael Salanter
YIVO Encyclopedia of Jews in Eastern Europe: Mussar Movement

 Contemporary efforts to revive the Musar movement
AishDas Society (Mussar Resources page)
 Alan Morinis on Discovering Mussar
Center for Contemporary Mussar (Rabbi Ira Stone)
Chai Mitzvah
Geoffrey Claussen on the American Jewish Revival of Musar
Salant Foundation (Rabbi Zvi Miller)
Musar Shiurim by Rav Nissan Kaplan of Mir Yeshiva, Jerusalem
Mussar Institute (Alan Morinis)

 
Jewish religious movements